Orhan Suda (1 July 1916 – 15 December 1978) was a Turkish cyclist. He competed in the two events at the 1936 Summer Olympics and two events at the 1948 Summer Olympics.

References

External links
 

1916 births
1978 deaths
Turkish male cyclists
Olympic cyclists of Turkey
Cyclists at the 1936 Summer Olympics
Cyclists at the 1948 Summer Olympics
Sportspeople from Adapazarı
20th-century Turkish people